Dame Amanda Jane Tipples,  (born 18 December 1966) is a British High Court judge.

Tipples was born in Pembury, England and was educated at Roedean School. She then attended Gonville and Caius College, Cambridge, where she studied zoology and specialised in molecular biology, graduating with a BA in 1989. She completed her law education at the Council of Legal Education.

She was called to the bar at Gray's Inn in 1991 and practised from Maitland Chambers. She served as a recorder from 2009 and took silk in 2011. In 2013, she was appointed a deputy High Court judge, hearing cases in the Chancery Division, and served as Lieutenant Bailiff of Guernsey from 2016 to 2019.

On 2 December 2019, Tipples was appointed a judge of the High Court, replacing Sir Paul Walker, and assigned to the Queen's Bench Division. She received the customary damehood in the same year. Since 2022, she has been Presiding Judge of the Midland Circuit.

References 

Living people
1968 births
British women judges
Dames Commander of the Order of the British Empire
Alumni of Gonville and Caius College, Cambridge
Members of Gray's Inn
Queen's Bench Division judges
People from Pembury
English King's Counsel
21st-century King's Counsel
21st-century English judges